Vi hade i alla fall tur med vädret – igen ("We were at least lucky with the weather – again") is a Swedish comedy film directed by Kjell-Åke Andersson, which was released premiere to cinemas in Sweden on 5 December 2008. It is a sequel to the 1980 film Vi hade i alla fall tur med vädret.

Plot
Now, almost 30 years after their travel trailer vacation, Gösta and Gun are pensioners. This summer they'll go to their son Johan's wedding in Norrland. Gösta buys a recreational vehicle for their journey but Gun perhaps wants to go by aircraft, but in the end she wants to go with Gösta by the recreational vehicle. On the way, they pick up their granddaughter Magda. But may Gösta really make a good journey?

Selected cast
Rolf Skoglund as Gösta
Claire Wikholm as Gun
Mikaela Knapp as Magda, Lotta's and Peppe's daughter
Gustav Berg as Jens, Magda's boyfriend
Magdalena in de Betou as Lotta, Gösta's and Gun's daughter
Jacob Ericksson as Peppe
Robin Stegmar as Johan
Ellen Mattsson as Pia, Johan's girlfriend
Sissela Kyle as Doctor
Johan Glans as Hambörje
Ulf Kvensler as Camping receptionist
Michalis Koutsogiannakis as Miklos

Home video
The film was released to DVD in 2009.

References

External links

Vi hade i alla fall tur med vädret – igen on www.moviezine.se

2008 films
Swedish comedy films
Films directed by Kjell-Åke Andersson
Films about vacationing
Swedish sequel films
2000s Swedish films